Vazha is a Georgian given name. Notable people with the name include:

Vazha Kacharava (born 1937), Georgian former volleyball player
Vazha Lortkipanidze (born 1949), Georgian politician and statesman, former Prime Minister of Georgia
Vazha Tarkhnishvili (born 1971), retired Georgian footballer
Vazha-Pshavela (1861–1915), the pen-name of the Georgian poet and writer Luka P. Razikashvili
Vazha Zarandia, Chairman of the Soviet of Ministers of Abkhazia from May 1992 to December 1993

See also
Vazha-Pshavela (biographical novel), a 2011 Georgian Biographical novel by author Miho Mosulishvili
Sirithu Vazha Vendum, a 1974 Indian Tamil directed by S. S. Balan
Vacha (disambiguation)
Vasa (disambiguation)
Vazhkai
Viacha
Visakha
Viscacha

Georgian masculine given names